"Cut Your Ribbon" is a song by American rock band Sparta. It serves as the first track and debut single off their debut album Wiretap Scars (2002). Another version of this song was released, and it contains many differences, most notably the lyrics. Also, the version of the song off the album has a tone to it that makes the song sound as if it were being performed live. The song received positive reviews from critics praising the instrumentation and vocal performance. The accompanying music video for the song was directed by Sophie Muller.

Critical reception
"Cut Your Ribbon" garnered a positive reception from music critics applauding the band's musicianship and Jim Ward's abilities as lead singer. Pitchfork writer Eric Carr said that the song was "simply splintering, power-hungry rock, showcasing the record's most memorable vocals." Reviewing the album, Steve Appleford of Rolling Stone felt the track "comes closest to the desperate noise of ATDI, with guitarist turned singer Jim Ward nailing a fine, furious scream." Punknews.org writer Daren called it "a strong introduction track. Its complex rhythm and guitars give a feel of things to come." Jason Jackowiak of Splendid described it as "a dynamic call-to-arms that piercingly and intrepidly proclaims Sparta's aural aesthetic. It's brash yet tuneful, angular yet accessible, fiercely experimental yet grounded in the lessons of their punk rock youth."

Music video

The video was directed by Sophie Muller.

Track listing
 Europe CD (Promo)
"Cut Your Ribbon" – 3:04

References

2002 songs
Sparta (band) songs
DreamWorks Records singles
2002 debut singles
Music videos directed by Sophie Muller